Addis Housewares is a British company manufacturing household products. Founded in 1780, the company, based in Bridgend in the United Kingdom, has design and manufacturing facilities in the United Kingdom, Germany, and the Far East. Addis products are sold in many large British homeware stores.

External links

 Official Website

Household and personal product companies of the United Kingdom
British companies established in 1780
Kitchenware brands